Villeneuve-de-Berg is a commune in the Ardèche department in southern France.

Geography
The village lies in the north central part of the commune, on the right bank of the river Ibie, which flows southward through the commune.

Population

See also
Communes of the Ardèche department

References

Communes of Ardèche
Ardèche communes articles needing translation from French Wikipedia